The SNCF Class Z 22500, also known as the MI 2N "Eole" or MI 2N (French: Matériel d'Interconnexion à 2 Niveaux, Est Ouest Liaison Express, English: two-level interconnection rolling stock for the east west express link) is a double-deck, dual-voltage electric multiple unit trainset that is operated on line E of the Réseau Express Régional (RER), a hybrid suburban commuter and rapid transit system serving Paris and its Île-de-France suburbs. The trains are SNCFs version of the MI 2N and looks similar to the other variant, the MI 2N "Altéo" trains (operated by the RATP) but each features different motorization and interior layout.

The 53 five-car trains were built by a consortium of French manufacturer Alstom (then known as GEC Alsthom) and Canadian conglomerate Bombardier. The final assembly of the trains was performed at Alstom's Valenciennes factory and Bombardier's Crespin factory between 1997 and 2000.

History 
By the end of the 1980s, the RER A line had become the busiest in the system and the busiest single rail line outside of East Asia. Overcrowding on the RER A was already the main transport problem in the greater Paris area. To address this issue, several projects were launched: the SNCF started construction of the Est Ouest Liaison Express (EOLE; English: east west express link) which would later be known as the RER E line, while the RATP started construction of the Paris Métro Line 14, both of which would both parallel the RER A in central Paris.

At about the same time, the RATP also began investigating using double-deck trains on the RER A. Double-deck trains, like the Z 2N series (Class Z 5600 and Class Z 8800) were already in use on suburban SNCF networks and could carry up to 2,600 people per train, compared to 1,887 people on the single-deck MS 61 trains that had been used on the RER A since it opened.

That left the RATP looking for new equipment for the RER A at the same time as SNCF needed to purchase equipment for the soon to open RER E line, so in 1989 they decided to team up and issue a call for tenders. In November 1992, they placed an order for 17 MI 2N trainsets from a consortium of French manufacturer Alstom (at the time known as GEC Alsthom) and Canadian conglomerate Bombardier. The MI 2N would be based on the design of SNCF's Class Z 20500 trains being built by the same consortium for RER C and RER D lines, but with modifications to make them better suited to the busy RER A line, most notably three wide doors on each side of the cars (the Z 20500 only had two).

The RATP version of the trains for the RER A would be called the MI 2N "Altéo", and the SNCF version for the RER E would be called the Class Z 22500, also known as the MI 2N "Eole" (after the EOLE name of the RER E during construction). The two trains look very similar from the outside, but the Class Z 22500 would only have two motors (the Altéo would feature three motors per trainset for faster acceleration) and would eliminate the stairs to the upper deck to the center vestibule adding 22 additional seats per train (the Altéo kept the stairs to speed the movement of passengers at stations).

A pre-production train was delivered on 10 March 1996 for joint testing by both RATP and SNCF. The Z 22500 trains were put into revenue service on the Paris-Saint-Lazare with only 4 cars per trainsets because of the short platform of Saint-Lazare station  and Paris - Est network of Transilien trains from September 1998 to June 1999. The Z 22500 trains were transferred to the RER E before its opening in July 1999, where they have been in service since.
[[|thumb|Departure sound from inside a Z22500]]

Technical description 

The Z 22500 (or MI 2N Eole) trains are the SNCF version of the MI 2N.

They constitute a new generation of two-level suburban railcars, intended solely for line E of the RER. They were developed jointly by SNCF and RATP.

The Z 22500 are 53 trains in number. They consist of five bodies, two of which are motorized, flanked by two trailers at the ends and flanking a central trailer; compared to the MI 2N Altéo which consist of three motor cars flanked by two trailers, the Z 22500 have less acceleration performance than the RATP version. Their layout is innovative with the three doors per body and per side which distinguish them from the Z 2N (Z 5600, Z 8800, Z 20500 and Z 20900). They can carry 2,600 people including 1,100 seated [unclear].

The Z 22500 are dual-current (direct 1.5 kV / single-phase 25 kV-50 Hz). This is not useful to them in service on the RER E but is useful during certain maintenance trips. They can be used both on high platforms (RATP type) and on normal platforms (SNCF), with the need to use steps in the case of low platforms, such as at Gare de l'Est.

Unlike the MI 2N Altéo of the RATP, the Z 22500 are not equipped with refrigerated ventilation, nor with the driving assistance system, operation and maintenance (SACEM) used on the RER A.

The Z 22500 are 112 meters long and are capable of reaching a speed of 140 km/h. A new train was worth 10 million euros when it was ordered.

A train is made up as follows:

ZRBxe221500 - ZBxe22500 - ZRBe222500 - ZABe22500 - ZRBxe221500

ZBxe and ZRBe cars are always odd, while ZABe cars are always even. For example, train 10E is composed as follows:

ZRBxe221519 - ZBxe22519 - ZRBe222519 - ZABe22520 - ZRBxe221520

The ZRBxe are equipped with a pantograph and a driver's cab but are not motorized, which sometimes confuses people.

The index letter "e" (two-level car) is optional as in this photo where only "ZRBx 221568" is written.

The trains benefit from the latest improvements in terms of active safety: continuous speed control, automatic braking, dual-mode RST/GSM-R radio link and television control of the platforms (3 screens). They are also equipped with passive safety devices designed for new generations of TGV (energy absorbers, anti-overlap system between each car) intended to guarantee the safety of passengers and the driver, in the event of a collision; they also have a central brush for the "tunnel recognition" of the E line.

The MI 2N Altéo and the MI 2N Eole behave identically when braking, but differ when accelerating. The acceleration of the Z 22500 reaches 1 m/s2, unlike that of the Altéo which reaches 1.1 m/s2. Nevertheless, the two homologous trains ensure a same deceleration reaching 1.1 m/s2.

Formations 
As of 1 March 2022, 53 Z22500 trainsets (01E to 53E), were based at the Chelles and Noisy-le-Sec SNCF depots.

As shown below, the trainsets are formed with three motored cars and three non-powered (trailer) cars (2M3T).

 < or > show a pantograph. Cars 1 and 5 were each equipped with one pantograph.

Photo gallery

References

Z 22500
Double-decker EMUs
Electric multiple units of France
25 kV AC multiple units
Alstom multiple units
Bombardier Transportation multiple units
1500 V DC multiple units of France